The Education World Forum, the largest annual gathering of education and skills ministers in the world, is held in London each January. The event is supported by the Foreign Commonwealth and Development Office, the Department for Education, the Department for International Development, the Department for International Trade and the British Council.

The Education World Forum brings together Ministers of Education, Higher Education and Skills, their advisors and delegations from across the world to address key issues and to share the education system challenges they face, the solutions they have found, the learning that has occurred and the successes they have achieved.

History
Founded in 2002 the Education World Forum was initially named 'Moving Young Minds' and the event was run by the governmental organisation Becta (British Educational Communications Technology Agency). It was renamed the “Learning and Technology World Forum” in 2009.

Following the May 2010 post-election spending review, the non-profit 'Education World Forum' assumed responsibility for the event, broadening its programme to encompass higher education and skills. Ministerial delegates representing over two thirds of the world's population attend the event each year.

Programme
The programme comprises keynote addresses, Ministerial keynotes, Ministerial Exchanges as well as time for networking and informal discussions.  These occasions include an official reception and official networking dinner hosted by Secretaries of State.

Recent event

2022
The Education World Forum 2022 was held in London from 22-25 May 2022. The theme of the 2022 event was 'Education: building forward together; stronger, bolder, better'. 

The event attracted 116 ministers, along with leaders from global and international organisations including UNICEF, the World Bank, the Organisation for Economic Co-operation and Development and the British Council and the Commonwealth. International corporations and industry partners with a focus on education and technology joined the participating Ministers of Education.

Upcoming event

2023
The Education World Forum will gather from 7-10 May 2023 in London in the United Kingdom.

References

International educational organizations